El corazón nunca se equivoca (English: The Heart is Never Wrong; shown onscreen as Juntos el corazón nunca se equivoca) is a Mexican television series produced by Juan Osorio for Televisa that premiered on Las Estrellas on 23 June 2019 and ended on 26 July 2019. The series stars Emilio Osorio and Joaquín Bondoni. It is a spin-off of the telenovela Mi marido tiene familia.

The series centers around the love story between Aristóteles and Temo, who leave Oaxaca to start a new life together in Mexico City.

Premise 
Aristóteles and Temo move to Mexico City to begin their university studies. Aristóteles is ready to start his music career and communication studies, and make time to be an influencer and have a relationship. Temo wants to be a politician despite the prejudices he may face. Their love will be tested when they make new friends and overcome the challenges in Mexican society for homosexuals.

Cast 

 Leticia Calderón as Elsa Reynoso, a teacher at the university and works as an advisor in the campaign of Ubaldo Ortega. She is separated from her husband Olegario Cervantes and is the mother of Andrés, who is deceased, and Carlota, with whom she has a bad relationship.
 Sergio Sendel as Ubaldo Ortega, is campaigning to be head of government of Mexico City. He is Soledad's husband and father of Diego. He is willing to do anything to achieve his goals, being an expert in appearances and manipulation of other people.
 Laura Flores as Soledad Elizalde, a woman submissive and self-sacrificing to the wishes of her husband, Ubaldo Ortega. She is a sculptor and has dedicated most of her life to her home. She is Diego's mother.
 Víctor González as Olegario Cervantes, he considers himself a revolutionary and liberal person. He is father of Andrés and Carlota and has separated from his wife Elsa. Olegario feels invaded by the guilt of having left his family and is willing to regain them.
 Helena Rojo as Dora Ortega, has a strong and controlling character, who has taken on the task of taking care of her sister Nora. Dora thinks it was because of her that her family collapsed. Dora administers the condominium where Polita, Aristóteles and Cuauhtémoc will live.
 Gabriela Platas as Amapola "Polita" Casteñeda, mother of Aristóteles. She is currently ready to live a new adventure with her boyfriend Eduardo as a professional woman in a world dominated by men.
 Nuria Bages as Nora Ortega, administers with her sister Dora a condominium in the Roma neighborhood, owned by her brother Ubaldo. She is a woman of good feelings, although most of these are kept hidden due to the strong and controlling nature of her sister Dora.
 Ale Müller as Carlota Cervantes, she is studying a career in communication. Carlota suffered a lot with the suicide of her brother Andrés and thinks that Elsa, her mother, is the main culprit, although she is sure that Ubaldo Ortega had something to do with it.
 Laura Vignatti as Daniela Córcega
 Nikolás Caballero as Diego Ortega, son of Ubaldo Ortega and Soledad Elizalde. He decided to get away from everything his parents had planned for him because he did not want to pursue a political career and decided to focus instead on the world of entertainment.
 Eduardo Barquin as Mateo, he is studying a degree in political science at one of the most prestigious universities in Mexico City. He is Jewish and has always believed that his socioeconomic status makes him different from other people.
 Santiago Zenteno as Eduardo
 Sian Chiong as Thiago
 Emiliano Vázquez as Julio López Treviño
 Alisson Coronado as Ana Lupe "Lupita" López Treviño
 Bruno Santamaría as Andrés Cervantes
 Arath de la Torre as Francisco "Pancho" López, a peculiar, modern man with a special sense of seeing life. He is Temo's father.
 Emilio Osorio as Aristóteles Córcega, he is ready to start his career in the music and university world in Mexico City to study a degree in communication with his boyfriend Cuauhtémoc López. He has positioned himself as an influencer on social media.
 Joaquín Bondoni as Cuauhtémoc "Temo" López, he wants to be a politician and study in Mexico City. In spite of being a homosexual man in a political world that tends to value heteronormativity, he can achieve what he proposes.
 Silvia Pinal as Imelda Sierra de Córcega

Production 
After the completion of Mi marido tiene familia, Juan Osorio announced that he would produce a spin-off with the characters Aristóteles and Temo as protagonists. Filming of the series began on 6 April 2019. The series will consist of 20 episodes. On 7 May 2019, Univision revealed through its upfront for the 2019-20 television season that the series title would be El corazón nunca se equivoca.

Ratings 
 
}}

Episodes 

Notes

Awards and nominations

References

External links 
 

2010s Mexican television series
Las Estrellas original programming
Mexican LGBT-related television shows
Mexican television series based on South Korean television series
Televisa telenovelas
2019 Mexican television series debuts
2019 Mexican television series endings
Television shows set in Mexico City
Spanish-language television shows
2010s LGBT-related television series
Gay-related television shows